The Cabinet of Moldova is the chief executive body of the Government of Moldova. Its function according to the Constitution of Moldova is "to carry out the domestic and foreign policy of the State and to apply general control over the work of public administration".

Structure of the cabinet

The Constitution states that "The Government consists of a Prime Minister, a first Deputy Prime Minister, Deputy Prime Ministers, Ministers and other cabinet Members, as determined by organic law,"..

Moldova is a republic with a democratically elected government, acting according to the principles of parliamentarism.

Legislative power is vested in the Parliament. Executive affairs of government are decided by the cabinet.

The composition of the cabinet is decided by the Prime Minister. The current number of ministries is 13.

Ministries
The 14 ministries of the Cabinet of Moldova are:

Ministry of Infrastructure and Regional Development
Ministry of Foreign Affairs and European Integration
Ministry of Justice
Ministry of Health
Ministry of Defense
Ministry of Internal Affairs
Ministry of Education and Research
Ministry of Economic Development and Digitalization
Ministry of Finance
Ministry of Environment
Ministry of Culture
Ministry of Labour and Social Protection
Ministry of Agriculture and Food Industry
Ministry of Energy

Governments of Moldova
The following is a list of all governments since 1917. It includes the governments of the Moldavian Democratic Republic, which unified with Romania in 1918 shortly after its creation, and the administration of the Moldavian Soviet Socialist Republic, which was a constituent republic of the highly centralized Soviet Union from 1940–1941 and again from 1944–1991.

Moldavian Democratic Republic

Moldavian Soviet Socialist Republic

Republic of Moldova

Current Cabinet of Ministers

See also
 List of prime ministers of Moldova
 Politics of Moldova
 Government of Moldova

References

External links
 Official Web Site of the Cabinet of Moldova

 
Lists of national cabinets
Government of Moldova
Legal history of Moldova
Political history of Moldova